The Formosa Hakka Radio (FHR) is a Hakka-language radio station in Taiwan.

History
The radio station was launched in 1994 as the first Hakka-language radio station in Taiwan.

References

External links
  

1994 establishments in Taiwan
Radio stations established in 1994
Radio stations in Taiwan